The Rousse Regional Historical Museum is one of the 11 regional museums of Bulgaria. It acts within the Rousse, Razgrad, and Silistra regions. The museum occupies the building of the former Battenberg Palace, previously a local court, built 1879–1882 by Friedrich Grünanger.

The Rousse Regional Historical Museum was established in 1904. Its basis are the archeological collections of Karel and Hermenguild Shkorpil, as well as of the naturalist Vasil Kovachev, which were gathered in the "Knyaz Boris" men's high school of Rousse.

Collection 
The museum holds approximately 140,000 items, including:
 prehistoric pottery and idol plastic arts
 the Borovo Treasure of the 4th century BC (a ritual wine set, gold-plated silver)
 the finds of excavations of the antique Danube castles Yatrus and Sexaginta Prista, and of the medieval Bulgarian city Cherven
 a collection of medieval frescoes
 a collection of exhibits of traditional lifestyle
 a collection of urban clothing, china, glass, and silver from the end of the 19th — beginning of the 20th century
 personal belongings of notable figures from the struggle for national liberation
 a numismatic collection
 a collection of bones from prehistoric mammals, including a unique lower jaw of a Mammuthus rumanus
 a bronze helmet from 4th–3rd century BC, which it is suggested may have belonged to one of the soldiers of Alexander the Great. The helmet was contributed in August 2006 by the Bobokovi brothers, major shareholders of the Prista Oil company. The time and place where the helmet was found was not publicly revealed.

The museum features seven full-time exhibitions, three of them being open-air:
 the Rock-hewn Churches of Ivanovo
 the Medieval city of Cherven
 the Roman castle of Sexaginta Prista

Gallery

Notes 

Buildings and structures in Ruse, Bulgaria
History museums in Bulgaria
Museums in Ruse Province
Palaces in Bulgaria